Anne and Jehanne is an 1894 signed oil on canvas painting by Laura Leroux-Revault, a French painter from the Lorraine region. It is now in the musée des Beaux-Arts de Nancy, whose collections it entered on 7 January 1896 as a state deposit. First exhibited at the Paris Salon of 1894, it is signed by the artist at bottom right. She was born at Dun-sur-Meuse in 1872, daughter of the painter Louis Hector Leroux (1829-1900), and died in 1936. It was restored in 1998.

References

French paintings
Paintings of children
19th-century portraits
1894 paintings
Paintings in the Museum of Fine Arts of Nancy